The Social Credit Party of Canada ran a number of candidates in the 1984 federal election, none of whom were elected.

Quebec

Richelieu: Rénald Bibeau
Rénald Bibeau listed himself as a day-worker.  He received 202 votes (0.42%), finishing sixth against Progressive Conservative candidate Louis Plamondon.

Ontario

Hamilton East: Vince G. Vostrez

Vostrez listed himself as a supervisor with National Steel Car.  It is possible that he is the same person as "Vaclav George Vostrez", a steelworker who twice campaigned for the Social Credit Party in Hamilton East during the 1960s.  For reasons of convenience, a single electoral history has been provided for both names.

See also
Social Credit Party candidates, 1979 Canadian federal election

References

Candidates in the 1984 Canadian federal election
Social Credit Party of Canada candidates for the Canadian House of Commons